The Epic of Gilgamesh is an epic poem from ancient Mesopotamia. The literary history of Gilgamesh begins with five Sumerian poems about Bilgamesh (Sumerian for "Gilgamesh"), king of Uruk, dating from the Third Dynasty of Ur. These independent stories were later used as source material for a combined epic in Akkadian. The first surviving version of this combined epic, known as the "Old Babylonian" version, dates back to the 18th century BC and is titled after its incipit, Shūtur eli sharrī ("Surpassing All Other Kings"). Only a few tablets of it have survived. The later Standard Babylonian version compiled by Sîn-lēqi-unninni dates from the 13th to the 10th centuries BC and bears the incipit Sha naqba īmuru ("He who Saw the Abyss", in unmetaphoric terms: "He who Sees the Unknown"). Approximately two-thirds of this longer, twelve-tablet version have been recovered. Some of the best copies were discovered in the library ruins of the 7th-century BC Assyrian king Ashurbanipal.

The first half of the story discusses Gilgamesh, king of Uruk, and Enkidu, a wild man created by the gods to stop Gilgamesh from oppressing the people of Uruk. After Enkidu becomes civilized through sexual initiation with Shamhat, he travels to Uruk, where he challenges Gilgamesh to a test of strength. Gilgamesh wins the contest; nonetheless, the two become friends. Together, they make a six-day journey to the legendary Cedar Forest, where they plan to slay the Guardian, Humbaba the Terrible, and cut down the sacred Cedar. The goddess Ishtar sends the Bull of Heaven to punish Gilgamesh for spurning her advances. Gilgamesh and Enkidu kill the Bull of Heaven after which the gods decide to sentence Enkidu to death and kill him.

In the second half of the epic, distress over Enkidu's death causes Gilgamesh to undertake a long and perilous journey to discover the secret of eternal life. He eventually learns that "Life, which you look for, you will never find. For when the gods created man, they let death be his share, and life withheld in their own hands". Nevertheless, because of his great building projects, his account of Siduri's advice, and what the immortal man Utnapishtim told him about the Great Flood, Gilgamesh's fame survived well after his death, with expanding interest in his story. It has been translated into many languages and is featured in several works of popular fiction.

The epic is regarded as a foundational work in religion and the tradition of heroic sagas, with Gilgamesh forming the prototype for later heroes like Heracles (Hercules), and the epic itself serving as an influence for Homeric epics.

History 

Distinct sources exist from over a 2000-year timeframe. The earliest Sumerian poems are now generally considered to be distinct stories, rather than parts of a single epic. They date from as early as the Third Dynasty of Ur. The Old Babylonian tablets, are the earliest surviving tablets for a single Epic of Gilgamesh narrative. The older Old Babylonian tablets and later Akkadian version are important sources for modern translations, with the earlier texts mainly used to fill in gaps (lacunae) in the later texts. Although several revised versions based on new discoveries have been published, the epic remains incomplete. Analysis of the Old Babylonian text has been used to reconstruct possible earlier forms of the epic. The most recent Akkadian version, also referred to as the Standard Babylonian version, consists of twelve tablets and was edited by Sîn-lēqi-unninni, who is thought to have lived sometime between 1300 BC and 1000 BC.

Some 15,000 fragments of Assyrian cuneiform tablets were discovered in the Library of Ashurbanipal in Nineveh by Austen Henry Layard, his assistant Hormuzd Rassam, and W. K. Loftus in the early 1850s. Late in the following decade, the British Museum hired George Smith to study these; in 1872, Smith read translated fragments before the Society of Biblical Archaeology, and in 1875 and 1876 he published fuller translations, the latter of which was published as The Chaldaean Account of Genesis. The central character of Gilgamesh was initially reintroduced to the world as "Izdubar", before the cuneiform logographs in his name could be pronounced accurately.  In 1891, Paul Haupt collected the cuneiform text, and nine years later, Peter Jensen provided a comprehensive edition; R. Campbell Thompson updated both of their work in 1930. Over the next two decades, Samuel Noah Kramer reassembled the Sumerian poems.

In 1998, American Assyriologist Theodore Kwasman discovered a piece believed to have contained the first lines of the epic in the storeroom of the British Museum; the fragment, found in 1878 and dated to between 600 BC and 100 BC, had remained unexamined by experts for more than a century since its recovery. The fragment read "He who saw all, who was the foundation of the land, who knew (everything), was wise in all matters: Gilgamesh."  The discovery of artifacts associated with Enmebaragesi of Kish, mentioned in the legends as the father of one of Gilgamesh's adversaries, has lent credibility to the historical existence of Gilgamesh.

In the early 2000s, the Gilgamesh Dream Tablet was imported illegally into the United States. According to the United States Department of Justice, the tablet was encrusted with dirt and unreadable when it was purchased by a US antiquities dealer in 2003. The tablet was sold by an unnamed antiques dealer in 2007 with a letter falsely stating that it had been inside a box of ancient bronze fragments purchased in a 1981 auction. In 2014, Hobby Lobby privately purchased the tablet for display at the Museum of the Bible in Washington, D.C. In 2019, the Gilgamesh Dream Tablet was seized by US officials and was returned to Iraq in September 2021.

Versions 

From the diverse sources found, two main versions of the epic have been partially reconstructed: the Standard Babylonian version, or He who saw the deep, and the Old Babylonian version, or Surpassing all other kings. Five earlier Sumerian poems about Gilgamesh have been partially recovered, some with primitive versions of specific episodes in the Babylonian version, others with unrelated stories.

Standard Babylonian version 
The Standard Babylonian version was discovered by Hormuzd Rassam in the library of Ashurbanipal in Nineveh in 1853. "Standard Babylonian" refers to a literary style that was used for literary purposes. This version was compiled by Sin-liqe-unninni sometime between 1300 and 1000 BC from earlier texts. One impact that Sin-liqe-unninni brought to the work was to bring the issue of mortality to the foreground, thus making it possible for the character to move from being an "adventurer to a wise man." According to Lins Brandão, the standard version can be seen in this sense as sapiential literature, common in the Middle East.

The Standard Babylonian version has different opening words, or incipit, from the older version. The older version begins with the words "Surpassing all other kings", while the Standard Babylonian version has "He who saw the deep" (ša naqba īmuru), "deep" referring to the mysteries of the information brought back by Gilgamesh from his meeting with Uta-Napishti (Utnapishtim) about Ea, the fountain of wisdom. Gilgamesh was given knowledge of how to worship the gods, why death was ordained for human beings, what makes a good king, and how to live a good life. The story of Utnapishtim, the hero of the flood myth, can also be found in the Babylonian epic of Atra-Hasis. The Standard version is also known as iškar Gilgāmeš, "Series of Gilgamesh".

The 12th tablet is a sequel to the original 11, and was probably appended at a later date. It bears little relation to the well-crafted 11-tablet epic; the lines at the beginning of the first tablet are quoted at the end of the 11th tablet, giving it circularity and finality. Tablet 12 is a near copy of an earlier Sumerian tale, a prequel, in which Gilgamesh sends Enkidu to retrieve some objects of his from the Underworld, and he returns in the form of a spirit to relate the nature of the Underworld to Gilgamesh.

In terms of form, the poetic conventions followed in the Standard Babylonian version appear to be inconsistent and are still controversial among scholars. There is, however, extensive use of parallelism across sets of two or three adjacent lines, much like in the Hebrew Psalms.

Genre 

When it was discovered in the 19th century, the story of Gilgamesh was classified as a Greek epic, a genre known in Europe, even though it predates the Greek culture that spawned epics, specifically, when Herodotus referred to the works of Homer in this way. When Alfred Jeremias translated the text, he insisted on the relationship to Genesis by giving the title "Izdubar-Nimrod" and by recognizing the genre as that of Greek heroic poetry. Although the equalization to Nimrod was dropped, the view of "Greek epic" was retained. Martin Litchfield West, in 1966, in the preface to his edition of Hesiod, recognized the proximity of the Greeks to the middle eastern center of convergence, "greek literature is a Near East literature." One difference between the Greek epic poems and Gilgamesh would be the fact that the Greek heroes acted in the context of war, while Gilgamesh acted in isolation (with the exception of Enkidu's brief existence) - and could equal Heracles.

Considering how the text would be viewed from the standpoint of its time is tricky, as George Smith acknowledges that there is no "Sumerian or Akkadian word for myth or heroic narrative, just as there is no ancient recognition of poetic narrative as a genre."  recognizes that the prologue of "He who Saw the Abyss" recalls the inspiration of the Greek Muses, even though there is no god's assistance here. It is also made explicit that Gilgamesh rose to the rank of an "ancient wise man" (antedeluvian). Lins Brandão continues, noting how the poem would have been "put on a stele" ("narû"), that at first "narû" could be seen as the genre of the poem, taking into consideration that the reader (or scribe) would have to pass the text on, without omitting or adding anything. The prologue also implies that Gilgamesh narrated his story to a copyist, thus being a kind of "autobiography in third person".

Content of the Standard Babylonian version tablets 
This summary is based on Andrew George's translation.

Tablet one 
The story introduces Gilgamesh, king of Uruk. Gilgamesh, two-thirds god and one-third man, is oppressing his people, who cry out to the gods for help. For the young women of Uruk this oppression takes the form of a droit du seigneur, or "lord's right", to sleep with brides on their wedding night. For the young men (the tablet is damaged at this point) it is conjectured that Gilgamesh exhausts them through games, tests of strength, or perhaps forced labour on building projects. The gods respond to the people's pleas by creating an equal to Gilgamesh who will be able to stop his oppression. This is the primitive man, Enkidu, who is covered in hair and lives in the wild with the animals. He is spotted by a trapper, whose livelihood is being ruined because Enkidu is uprooting his traps. The trapper tells the sun-god Shamash about the man, and it is arranged for Enkidu to be seduced by Shamhat, a temple prostitute, his first step towards being tamed. After six days and seven nights (or two weeks, according to more recent scholarship) of lovemaking and teaching Enkidu about the ways of civilization, she takes Enkidu to a shepherd's camp to learn how to be civilized. Gilgamesh, meanwhile, has been having dreams about the imminent arrival of a beloved new companion and asks his mother, Ninsun, to help interpret these dreams.

Tablet two 

Shamhat brings Enkidu to the shepherds' camp, where he is introduced to a human diet and becomes the night watchman. Learning from a passing stranger about Gilgamesh's treatment of new brides, Enkidu is incensed and travels to Uruk to intervene at a wedding. When Gilgamesh attempts to visit the wedding chamber, Enkidu blocks his way, and they fight. After a fierce battle, Enkidu acknowledges Gilgamesh's superior strength and they become friends. Gilgamesh proposes a journey to the Cedar Forest to slay the monstrous demi-god Humbaba in order to gain fame and renown. Despite warnings from Enkidu and the council of elders, Gilgamesh is not deterred.

Tablet three 
The elders give Gilgamesh advice for his journey. Gilgamesh visits his mother, the goddess Ninsun, who seeks the support and protection of the sun-god Shamash for their adventure. Ninsun adopts Enkidu as her son, and Gilgamesh leaves instructions for the governance of Uruk in his absence.

Tablet four 

Gilgamesh and Enkidu journey to the Cedar Forest. Every few days they camp on a mountain, and perform a dream ritual. Gilgamesh has five terrifying dreams about falling mountains, thunderstorms, wild bulls, and a thunderbird that breathes fire. Despite similarities between his dream figures and earlier descriptions of Humbaba, Enkidu interprets these dreams as good omens, and denies that the frightening images represent the forest guardian. As they approach the cedar mountain, they hear Humbaba bellowing, and have to encourage each other not to be afraid.

Tablet five 

The heroes enter the cedar forest. Humbaba, the guardian of the Cedar Forest, insults and threatens them. He accuses Enkidu of betrayal, and vows to disembowel Gilgamesh and feed his flesh to the birds. Gilgamesh is afraid, but with some encouraging words from Enkidu the battle commences. The mountains quake with the tumult and the sky turns black. The god Shamash sends 13 winds to bind Humbaba, and he is captured. Humbaba pleads for his life, and Gilgamesh pities him. He offers to make Gilgamesh king of the forest, to cut the trees for him, and to be his slave. Enkidu, however, argues that Gilgamesh should kill Humbaba to establish his reputation forever. Humbaba curses them both and Gilgamesh dispatches him with a blow to the neck, as well as killing his seven sons. The two heroes cut down many cedars, including a gigantic tree that Enkidu plans to fashion into a gate for the temple of Enlil. They build a raft and return home along the Euphrates with the giant tree and (possibly) the head of Humbaba.

Tablet six 
Gilgamesh rejects the advances of the goddess Ishtar because of her mistreatment of previous lovers like Dumuzi. Ishtar asks her father Anu to send the Bull of Heaven to avenge her. When Anu rejects her complaints, Ishtar threatens to raise the dead who will "outnumber the living" and "devour them". Anu states that if he gives her the Bull of Heaven, Uruk will face 7 years of famine. Ishtar provides him with provisions for 7 years in exchange for the bull. Ishtar leads the Bull of Heaven to Uruk, and it causes widespread devastation. It lowers the level of the Euphrates river, and dries up the marshes. It opens up huge pits that swallow 300 men. Without any divine assistance, Enkidu and Gilgamesh attack and slay it, and offer up its heart to Shamash. When Ishtar cries out, Enkidu hurls one of the hindquarters of the bull at her. The city of Uruk celebrates, but Enkidu has an ominous dream about his future failure.

Tablet seven 
In Enkidu's dream, the gods decide that one of the heroes must die because they killed Humbaba and Gugalanna. Despite the protestations of Shamash, Enkidu is marked for death. Enkidu curses the great door he has fashioned for Enlil's temple. He also curses the trapper and Shamhat for removing him from the wild. Shamash reminds Enkidu of how Shamhat fed and clothed him, and introduced him to Gilgamesh. Shamash tells him that Gilgamesh will bestow great honors upon him at his funeral, and will wander into the wild consumed with grief. Enkidu regrets his curses and blesses Shamhat instead. In a second dream, however, he sees himself being taken captive to the Netherworld by a terrifying Angel of Death. The underworld is a "house of dust" and darkness whose inhabitants eat clay, and are clothed in bird feathers, supervised by terrifying beings. For 12 days, Enkidu's condition worsens. Finally, after a lament that he could not meet a heroic death in battle, he dies. In a famous line from the epic, Gilgamesh clings to Enkidu's body and denies that he has died until a maggot drops from the corpse's nose.

Tablet eight 
Gilgamesh delivers a lament for Enkidu, in which he calls upon mountains, forests, fields, rivers, wild animals, and all of Uruk to mourn for his friend. Recalling their adventures together, Gilgamesh tears at his hair and clothes in grief. He commissions a funerary statue, and provides grave gifts from his treasury to ensure that Enkidu has a favourable reception in the realm of the dead. A great banquet is held where the treasures are offered to the gods of the Netherworld. Just before a break in the text there is a suggestion that a river is being dammed, indicating a burial in a river bed, as in the corresponding Sumerian poem, The Death of Gilgamesh.

Tablet nine 
Tablet nine opens with Gilgamesh roaming the wild wearing animal skins, grieving for Enkidu. Having now become fearful of his own death, he decides to seek Utnapishtim ("the Faraway"), and learn the secret of eternal life. Among the few survivors of the Great Flood, Utnapishtim and his wife are the only humans to have been granted immortality by the gods. Gilgamesh crosses a mountain pass at night and encounters a pride of lions. Before sleeping he prays for protection to the moon god Sin. Then, waking from an encouraging dream, he kills the lions and uses their skins for clothing. After a long and perilous journey, Gilgamesh arrives at the twin peaks of Mount Mashu at the end of the earth. He comes across a tunnel, which no man has ever entered, guarded by two scorpion monsters, who appear to be a married couple. The husband tries to dissuade Gilgamesh from passing, but the wife intervenes, expresses sympathy for Gilgamesh, and (according to the poem's editor Benjamin Foster) allows his passage. He passes under the mountains along the Road of the Sun. In complete darkness he follows the road for 12 "double hours", managing to complete the trip before the Sun catches up with him. He arrives at the Garden of the gods, a paradise full of jewel-laden trees.

Tablet ten 
Gilgamesh meets alewife Siduri, who assumes that he is a murderer or thief because of his disheveled appearance. Gilgamesh tells her about the purpose of his journey. She attempts to dissuade him from his quest, but sends him to Urshanabi the ferryman, who will help him cross the sea to Utnapishtim. Gilgamesh, out of spontaneous rage, destroys the stone charms that Urshanabi keeps with him. He tells him his story, but when he asks for his help, Urshanabi informs him that he has just destroyed the objects that can help them cross the Waters of Death, which are deadly to the touch. Urshanabi instructs Gilgamesh to cut down 120 trees and fashion them into punting poles. When they reach the island where Utnapishtim lives, Gilgamesh recounts his story, asking him for his help. Utnapishtim reprimands him, declaring that fighting the common fate of humans is futile and diminishes life's joys.

Tablet eleven 

Gilgamesh observes that Utnapishtim seems no different from himself, and asks him how he obtained his immortality. Utnapishtim explains that the gods decided to send a great flood. To save Utnapishtim the god Enki told him to build a boat. He gave him precise dimensions, and it was sealed with pitch and bitumen. His entire family went aboard together with his craftsmen and "all the animals of the field". A violent storm then arose which caused the terrified gods to retreat to the heavens. Ishtar lamented the wholesale destruction of humanity, and the other gods wept beside her. The storm lasted six days and nights, after which "all the human beings turned to clay". Utnapishtim weeps when he sees the destruction. His boat lodges on a mountain, and he releases a dove, a swallow, and a raven. When the raven fails to return, he opens the ark and frees its inhabitants. Utnapishtim offers a sacrifice to the gods, who smell the sweet savor and gather around. Ishtar vows that just as she will never forget the brilliant necklace that hangs around her neck, she will always remember this time. When Enlil arrives, angry that there are survivors, she condemns him for instigating the flood. Enki also castigates him for sending a disproportionate punishment. Enlil blesses Utnapishtim and his wife, and rewards them with eternal life.

The main point seems to be that when Enlil granted eternal life it was a unique gift. As if to demonstrate this point, Utnapishtim challenges Gilgamesh to stay awake for six days and seven nights. Gilgamesh falls asleep, and Utnapishtim instructs his wife to bake a loaf of bread on each of the days he is asleep, so that he cannot deny his failure to keep awake. Gilgamesh, who is seeking to overcome death, cannot even conquer sleep. After instructing Urshanabi, the ferryman, to wash Gilgamesh and clothe him in royal robes, they depart for Uruk.
As they are leaving, Utnapishtim's wife asks her husband to offer a parting gift. Utnapishtim tells Gilgamesh that at the bottom of the sea there lives a boxthorn-like plant that will make him young again. Gilgamesh, by binding stones to his feet so he can walk on the bottom, manages to obtain the plant. Gilgamesh proposes to investigate if the plant has the hypothesized rejuvenation ability by testing it on an old man once he returns to Uruk.
When Gilgamesh stops to bathe, it is stolen by a serpent, who sheds its skin as it departs. Gilgamesh weeps at the futility of his efforts, because he has now lost all chance of immortality. He returns to Uruk, where the sight of its massive walls prompts him to praise this enduring work to Urshanabi.

Tablet twelve 
This tablet is mainly an Akkadian translation of an earlier Sumerian poem, "Gilgamesh and the Netherworld" (also known as "Gilgamesh, Enkidu, and the Netherworld" and variants), although it has been suggested that it is derived from an unknown version of that story. The contents of this last tablet are inconsistent with previous ones: Enkidu is still alive, despite having died earlier in the epic. Because of this, its lack of integration with the other tablets, and the fact that it is almost a copy of an earlier version, it has been referred to as an 'inorganic appendage' to the epic. Alternatively, it has been suggested that "its purpose, though crudely handled, is to explain to Gilgamesh (and the reader) the various fates of the dead in the Afterlife" and in "an awkward attempt to bring closure", it both connects the Gilgamesh of the epic with the Gilgamesh who is the King of the Netherworld, and is "a dramatic capstone whereby the twelve-tablet epic ends on one and the same theme, that of "seeing" (= understanding, discovery, etc.), with which it began."

Gilgamesh complains to Enkidu that various of his possessions (the tablet is unclear exactly what different translations include a drum and a ball) have fallen into the underworld. Enkidu offers to bring them back. Delighted, Gilgamesh tells Enkidu what he must and must not do in the underworld if he is to return. Enkidu does everything which he was told not to do. The underworld keeps him. Gilgamesh prays to the gods to give him back his friend. Enlil and Suen don't reply, but Enki and Shamash decide to help. Shamash makes a crack in the earth, and Enkidu's ghost jumps out of it. The tablet ends with Gilgamesh questioning Enkidu about what he has seen in the underworld.

Old Babylonian versions 
This version of the epic, called in some fragments Surpassing all other kings, is composed of tablets and fragments from diverse origins and states of conservation. It remains incomplete in its majority, with several tablets missing and big lacunae in those found. They are named after their current location or the place where they were found.

Pennsylvania tablet 
Surpassing all other kings Tablet II, greatly correlates with tablets I–II of the Standard Babylonian version.
Gilgamesh tells his mother Ninsun about two dreams he had. His mother explains that they mean that a new companion will soon arrive at Uruk. In the meanwhile the wild Enkidu and the priestess (here called Shamkatum) have sex. She tames him in company of the shepherds by offering him bread and beer. Enkidu helps the shepherds by guarding the sheep. They travel to Uruk to confront Gilgamesh and stop his abuses. Enkidu and Gilgamesh battle but Gilgamesh breaks off the fight. Enkidu praises Gilgamesh.

Yale tablet 
Surpassing all other kings Tablet III, partially matches tablets II–III of the Standard Babylonian version.
For reasons unknown (the tablet is partially broken) Enkidu is in a sad mood. In order to cheer him up Gilgamesh suggests going to the Pine Forest to cut down trees and kill Humbaba (known here as Huwawa). Enkidu protests, as he knows Huwawa and is aware of his power. Gilgamesh talks Enkidu into it with some words of encouragement, but Enkidu remains reluctant. They prepare, and call for the elders. The elders also protest, but after Gilgamesh talks to them, they agree to let him go. After Gilgamesh asks his god (Shamash) for protection, and both he and Enkidu equip themselves, they leave with the elders' blessing and counsel.

Philadelphia fragment 
Possibly another version of the contents of the Yale Tablet, practically irrecoverable.

Nippur school tablet 
In the journey to the cedar forest and Huwawa, Enkidu interprets one of Gilgamesh's dreams.

Tell Harmal tablets 
Fragments from two different versions/tablets tell how Enkidu interprets one of Gilgamesh's dreams on the way to the Forest of Cedar, and their conversation when entering the forest.

Ishchali tablet 
After defeating Huwawa, Gilgamesh refrains from slaying him, and urges Enkidu to hunt Huwawa's "seven auras". Enkidu convinces him to smite their enemy. After killing Huwawa and the auras, they chop down part of the forest and discover the gods' secret abode. The rest of the tablet is broken.

The auras are not referred to in the Standard Babylonian version, but are in one of the Sumerian poems.

Partial fragment in Baghdad 
Partially overlapping the felling of the trees from the Ishchali tablet.

Sippar tablet 
Partially overlapping the Standard Babylonian version tablets IX–X.
Gilgamesh mourns the death of Enkidu wandering in his quest for immortality. Gilgamesh argues with Shamash about the futility of his quest. After a lacuna, Gilgamesh talks to Siduri about his quest and his journey to meet Utnapishtim (here called Uta-na'ishtim). Siduri attempts to dissuade Gilgamesh in his quest for immortality, urging him to be content with the simple pleasures of life. After one more lacuna, Gilgamesh smashes the "stone ones" and talks to the ferryman Urshanabi (here called Sur-sunabu). After a short discussion, Sur-sunabu asks him to carve 300 oars so that they may cross the waters of death without needing the "stone ones". The rest of the tablet is missing.

The text on the Old Babylonian Meissner fragment (the larger surviving fragment of the Sippar tablet) has been used to reconstruct possible earlier forms of the Epic of Gilgamesh, and it has been suggested that a "prior form of the story – earlier even than that preserved on the Old Babylonian fragment – may well have ended with Siduri sending Gilgamesh back to Uruk..." and "Utnapistim was not originally part of the tale."

Sumerian poems 
There are five extant Gilgamesh stories in the form of older poems in Sumerian. These probably circulated independently, rather than being in the form of a unified epic. Some of the names of the main characters in these poems differ slightly from later Akkadian names; for example, "Bilgamesh" is written instead of "Gilgamesh", and there are some differences in the underlying stories such as the fact that Enkidu is Gilgamesh's servant in the Sumerian version:
 The lord to the Living One's Mountain and Ho, hurrah! correspond to the Cedar Forest episode (Standard Babylonian version tablets II–V). Gilgamesh and Enkidu travel with other men to the Forest of Cedar. There, trapped by Huwawa, Gilgamesh tricks him (with Enkidu's assistance in one of the versions) into giving up his auras, thus losing his power.
 Hero in battle corresponds to the Bull of Heaven episode (Standard Babylonian version tablet VI) in the Akkadian version. The Bull's voracious appetite causes drought and hardship in the land while Gilgamesh feasts. Lugalbanda convinces him to face the beast and fights it alongside Enkidu.
 The envoys of Akka has no corresponding episode in the epic, but the themes of whether to show mercy to captives, and counsel from the city elders, also occur in the Standard Babylonian version of the Humbaba story. In the poem, Uruk faces a siege from a Kish army led by King Akka, whom Gilgamesh defeats and forgives.
 In those days, in those far-off days, otherwise known as Gilgamesh, Enkidu, and the Netherworld, is the source for the Akkadian translation included as tablet XII in the Standard Babylonian version, telling of Enkidu's journey to the Netherworld. It is also the main source of information for the Sumerian creation myth and the story of "Inanna and the Huluppu Tree".
 The great wild bull is lying down, a poem about Gilgamesh's death, burial and consecration as a semigod, reigning and giving judgement over the dead. After dreaming of how the gods decide his fate after death, Gilgamesh takes counsel, prepares his funeral and offers gifts to the gods. Once deceased, he is buried under the Euphrates, taken off its course and later returned to it.

Translations
The first direct Arabic translation from the original tablets was published in the 1960s by Iraqi archaeologist Taha Baqir.

The definitive modern translation is a two-volume critical work by Andrew George, published by Oxford University Press in 2003. A book review by Cambridge scholar Eleanor Robson claims that George's is the most significant critical work on Gilgamesh in the last 70 years. George discusses the state of the surviving material, and provides a tablet-by-tablet exegesis, with a dual language side-by-side translation.

In 2004, Stephen Mitchell supplied a controversial version that takes many liberties with the text and includes modernized allusions and commentary relating to the Iraq War of 2003.

In 2021, a translation by Sophus Helle was published by Yale University Press.

Later influence

Relationship to the Bible 
Various themes, plot elements, and characters in the Hebrew Bible correlate with the Epic of Gilgameshnotably, the accounts of the Garden of Eden, the advice from Ecclesiastes, and the Genesis flood narrative.

Garden of Eden 
The parallels between the stories of Enkidu/Shamhat and Adam/Eve have been long recognized by scholars. In both, a man is created from the soil by a god, and lives in a natural setting amongst the animals. He is introduced to a woman who tempts him. In both stories the man accepts food from the woman, covers his nakedness, and must leave his former realm, unable to return. The presence of a snake that steals a plant of immortality from the hero later in the epic is another point of similarity. However, a major difference between the two stories is that while Enkidu experiences regret regarding his seduction away from nature, this is only temporary: After being confronted by the god Shamash for being ungrateful, Enkidu recants and decides to give the woman who seduced him his final blessing before he dies. This is in contrast to Adam, whose fall from grace is largely portrayed as a punishment for disobeying God and the inevitable consequence of the loss of innocence regarding good and evil.

Advice from Ecclesiastes 
Several scholars suggest direct borrowing of Siduri's advice by the author of Ecclesiastes.

A rare proverb about the strength of a triple-stranded rope, "a triple-stranded rope is not easily broken", is common to both books.

Noah's flood 
Andrew George submits that the Genesis flood narrative matches that in Gilgamesh so closely that "few doubt" that it derives from a Mesopotamian account. What is particularly noticeable is the way the Genesis flood story follows the Gilgamesh flood tale "point by point and in the same order", even when the story permits other alternatives. In a 2001 Torah commentary released on behalf of the Conservative Movement of Judaism, rabbinic scholar Robert Wexler stated: "The most likely assumption we can make is that both Genesis and Gilgamesh drew their material from a common tradition about the flood that existed in Mesopotamia. These stories then diverged in the retelling." Ziusudra, Utnapishtim and Noah are the respective heroes of the Sumerian, Akkadian and biblical flood legends of the ancient Near East.

Additional biblical parallels 
Matthias Henze suggests that Nebuchadnezzar's madness in the biblical Book of Daniel draws on the Epic of Gilgamesh. He claims that the author uses elements from the description of Enkidu to paint a sarcastic and mocking portrait of the king of Babylon.

Many characters in the Epic have mythical biblical parallels, most notably Ninti, the Sumerian goddess of life, was created from Enki's rib to heal him after he had eaten forbidden flowers. It is suggested that this story served as the basis for the story of Eve created from Adam's rib in the Book of Genesis.
Esther J. Hamori, in Echoes of Gilgamesh in the Jacob Story, also claims that the myth of Jacob and Esau is paralleled with the wrestling match between Gilgamesh and Enkidu.

Book of Giants 
Gilgamesh is mentioned in one version of The Book of Giants which is related to the Book of Enoch. The Book of Giants version found at Qumran mentions the Sumerian hero Gilgamesh and the monster Humbaba with the Watchers and giants.

Influence on Homer 
Numerous scholars have drawn attention to various themes, episodes, and verses, indicating that the Epic of Gilgamesh had a substantial influence on both of the epic poems ascribed to Homer. These influences are detailed by Martin Litchfield West in The East Face of Helicon: West Asiatic Elements in Greek Poetry and Myth. According to Tzvi Abusch of Brandeis University, the poem "combines the power and tragedy of the Iliad with the wanderings and marvels of the Odyssey. It is a work of adventure, but is no less a meditation on some fundamental issues of human existence." Martin West, in "The East face of Helicon," speculates that the memory of Gilgamesh would have reached the Greeks through a lost poem about Heracles.

In popular culture 

The Epic of Gilgamesh has inspired many works of literature, art, and music. It was only after World War I that the Gilgamesh epic reached a modern audience, and only after World War II that it was featured in a variety of genres.

See also 

 List of artifacts in biblical archaeology
 List of characters in Epic of Gilgamesh
 Babylonian literature
 Cattle in religion
 Sumerian creation myth
 Sumerian literature

Notes

References

Sources

Further reading 
 Translations
 
 
 : (Volume 1) in the original Akkadian cuneiform and transliteration; commentary and glossary are in English
 : re-print of the Penguin Classic translation (in prose) by N. K. Sandars 1960 without the introduction.
  – an adaptation for young adults, translated directly to Hebrew from the original Akkadian language by Shin Shifra

 Versions
 
 
  First published in 1970 by Houghton Mifflin; Mentor Books paperback published 1972.

 Analysis
 
 
 
 
 (Portuguese Wikisource. Internet Archive)
 (Internet Archive)

 Articles
 Macfarlane, Robert, "A Fireball from the Sands" (review of Gilgamesh: A New Translation of the Ancient Epic, translated from the Akkadian and with essays by Sophus Helle, Yale University Press, 2022, 286 pp.), The New York Review of Books, vol. LXIX, no. 16 (20 October 2022), pp. 65–67.

External links 

I.4 Poem of Gilgameš critical edition and translation of the text (electronic Babylonian Library).
 Translations of the legends of Gilgamesh in the Sumerian language can be found in Black, J.A., Cunningham, G., Fluckiger-Hawker, E, Robson, E., and Zólyomi, G., The Electronic Text Corpus of Sumerian Literature, Oxford 1998–
 Gilgamesh and Huwawa, version A
 Gilgamesh and Huwawa, version B
 Gilgamesh and the Bull of Heaven
 Gilgamesh and Aga
 Gilgamesh, Enkidu and the nether world
 The death of Gilgamesh
 , edited by Morris Jastrow, translated by Albert T. Clay
The Epic of Gilgamesh, Complete Academic Translation by R. Campbell Thompson
The Epic of Gilgamesh by Kovacs, M.G.

 
21st-century BC books
Fiction set in the 3rd millennium BC
1853 archaeological discoveries
Gilgamesh
Flood myths
Fiction about immortality
Lost poems
Poems adapted into films
Prostitution in literature
Sumer in fiction
Sumerian literature
Akkadian literature
Works about monarchs
Gilgamesh